Greenough is an English surname. Notable people with the surname include:

 Bobby Greenough, English rugby league footballer of the 1950s and 1960s
 Gail Greenough (born 1960), Canadian equestrian
 George Greenough, surfer and cinematographer
 George Bellas Greenough (1778–1855), English geologist
 Horatio Greenough (1805–1852), American sculptor
 James Bradstreet Greenough (1833–1901), American classical scholar
 James C. Greenough (1829-1924), American educator
 Louis Greenough (1853–1932), American pioneer of South Dakota
 Peter Greenough (1917–2006), American journalist
 Richard Saltonstall Greenough (1819–1904), American sculptor
 Ricky Greenough (born 1961), English footballer